This is an alphabetical list of topics related to Islam, the history of Islam, Islamic culture, and the present-day Muslim world, intended to provide inspiration for the creation of new articles and categories. This list is not complete; please add to it as needed. This list may contain multiple transliterations of the same word: please do not delete the multiple alternative spellings—instead, please make redirects to the appropriate pre-existing Wikipedia article if one is present.

For a list of articles ordered by topic, instead of alphabetically, see Outline of Islamic and Muslim related topics.

For a structured list of existing articles on Islam, please see :Category:Islam.



0-9
 99 Names of God

A
 A'lam
 A'maal
 A'uzu billahi minashaitanir rajim
 A. R. Rahman
 Aalim
 Aaron
 Aash Al Maleek
 Aashurah
 Ababda
 Abar Ali
 Abaya
 Abbadid
 Abbas
 Abbas I of Persia
 Abbasid Caliphate
 Abbasid invasion of Asia Minor (782)
 Abbasid invasion of Asia Minor (806)
 Abd al-Malik ibn Salih
 Abd al-Qadir al-Jaza'iri
 Abd Allah ibn Abd al-Muttalib
 Abd Allah ibn Zubayr
 Abdallah ibn Abd al-Malik
 Abd ar-Rahman al-Haydari al-Kaylani
 'Abd Shams
 Abdel Aziz al-Rantissi
 Abdelaziz Bouteflika
 Abdest
 Abdoldjavad Falaturi
 Abdul Aziz al-Hakim
 Abdul Kalam
 Abdul Karim Qassim
 Abdul Qadir Jilani
 Abdul Rahman Munif
 Abdullah I of Jordan
 Abdullah II of Jordan
 Abdullah Yusuf Ali
 Abdullah Yusuf Azzam
 Abdullah of Saudi Arabia
 Abdur-Rahman ibn 'Awf
 Abdurrahman Wahid
 Abdus Salam
 Abjad
 Abjad numerals
 Ablution
 Abolhassan Banisadr
 Abraham in Islam
 Abrahamic religion
 Abrogation
 Abu Al Fazal Abdul Wahid Yemeni Tamimi
 Abu al-Qasim al-Zahrawi
 Abu Bakar Bashir
 Abu Bakr
 Abu Ghraib prisoner abuse
 Abu Hurairah
 Abu Mansur Al Maturidi
 Abu Muhammad Lulu al-Kabir
 Abu Musab al-Zarqawi
 Abu Muslim
 Abu Nasr Mansur
 Abu Saeed Mubarak Makhzoomi
 Abu Sufiyan ibn Harb
 Abu Talib
 Abu'l-Hasan al-Uqlidisi
 Abu'l Qasim (Seljuk governor of Nicaea)
 Adal Sultanate
 Adam
 Adam and Eve
 Adem
 Adewale Ayuba
 Adhan
 'Adl
 Afghanistan
 Aghlabid
 Ahkam
 Ahl al-Hadith
 Ahl ar-ra'y
 Ahlul-Bayt
 Ahl-i Hadith
 Ahmad ibn Fadlan
 Ahmad Tejan Kabbah
 Ahmadi
 Ahmadiyya Muslim Community
 Ahmadou Ahidjo
 Ahmed Ben Bella
 Ahmed H. Zewail
 Ahmed Qurei
 Ahmed Raza Khan
 Ahmed Shah Massoud
 Ahmed Sékou Touré
 Ahmed Urabi
 Ahmed Yassin
 Ahmet Necdet Sezer
 Ahwat
 Ahzab
 Aisha
 Akbar
 Akbar Hashemi Rafsanjani
 Akhirah
 Al Battani
 Al Imran
 Al Jazeera
 Al-Abbas ibn al-Ma'mun
 Al-Abbas ibn al-Walid
 Al-Afdal Shahanshah
 Al-Andalus
 Al-Aqsa Intifada (Second Intifada)
 Al-asharatu mubashshirun
 Al-'Awasim
 Al-Azhar Shia Fatwa
 Al-Azhar University
 Al-Biruni
 Al-Dahhak ibn Qays al-Shaybani
 Al-Dinawari
 Al-Farabi
 Al-Farghani
 Al-Fil
 Al-Ghazali
 Al-Hajjaj bin Yousef
 Al-Hakim bi-Amr Allah
 Al-Hallaj
 Al-hamdu lillahi rabbil 'alamin
 Ali
 Al-Ikhlas
 Al-isra
 Al-Jazari
 Al-Kafirun
 Al-Khidr
 Al-Khwarizmi
 Al-Kindi
 Al-Ma'ida
 Al-Ma'un
 Al-Mahdi
 Al-Mansur
 Al-Masad
 Al-Masudi
 Al-Mawardi
 Al-Mundhir
 Al-Mutawakkil
 Al-Qaeda
 Al-Safa and Al-Marwah
 Al-Tirmidhi
 Al-urf
 Alawite
 Alchemy
 Ale Muhammad
 Aleppo
 Alevi
 Algeria
 Alhamdulillah
 Alhazen
 Alhurra
 Ali
 Ali al-Hadi
 Ali al-Sistani
 Ali ar-Rida
 Ali Hassan Mwinyi
 Ali ibn Abi Talib
 Ali ibn Husayn
 Ali ibn Yahya al-Armani
 Ali Khamenei
 Ali Muhammad Ghedi
 Ali Shariati
 Alija Izetbegovic
 Alim
 Alkali
 Allah
 Allahu Akbar
 Almohad Caliphate
 Almoravid dynasty
 Almsgiving
 Alp Arslan
 Amal Movement
 Amin
 Amin al-Husayni
 Amin Maalouf
 Amir
 Amir al-mumineen
 Amman
 Amman Message
 Amr bil Ma-roof
 Amr ibn al-As
 An-Nas
 An-Nasr
 An-Nisa
 Anabasis (Xenophon)
 Ancient warfare
 Andalusi Arabic
 Angel
 Angels
 Ansar
 Anwar Sadat
 Apostasy in Islam
 Aqabah
 Aqidah
 Arab
 Arab Charter on Human Rights
 Arab music
 Arab nationalism
 Arab world
 Arab–Israeli conflict
 Arabesque
 Arabic alphabet
 Arabic grammar
 Arabic language
 Arabic literature
 Arabic name
 Arabist
 Arabs
 Araf
 Arafah
 Arafat
 Aramaic language
 Architectural history
 Arkan al-Islam
 Ardalani, Elvia
 Arsh
 Art Blakey
 As-Salih Ayyub
 As-Salih Ismail al-Malik
 Asabiyyah
 Asharite
 Ashgabat
 Ashura
 Askia Mohammad I
 Asr
 Assalamu alaikum
 Astaghfirullah
 Aurangzeb
 Averroes
 Avicenna
 Awqiyyah
 Awrah
 Axum
 Ayah
 Ayat
 Ayatollah
 Ayman al-Zawahiri
 Ayub Khan
 Ayyubid dynasty
 Azaan
 Azerbaijani language
 Azrael
 A Common Word Between Us and You

B
 Ba'ath Party
 Baab-al-Salaam
 Babur
 Badar
 Badiyyah
 Badr
 Baghdad
 Bahrainona
 Baibars
 Baitul Maqdis
 Baitul Mukarram
 Bakkah
 Baku
 Baligh
 Bam
 Bangladesh
 Bani Isra'il
 Banten
 Banu Abd Shams
 Banu Hashim
 Banu Isam
 Baqi
 Barakah
 Barakallah
 Basmala
 Bassam Tibi
 Batil
 Battle of Badr
 Battle of Tabouk
 Battle of Talas
 Bawadi
 Bay'ah
 Bayt al-mal
 Belly dance
 Benazir Bhutto
 Bengali language
 Bengali Muslims
 Berber
 Berber languages
 Bernard Lewis
 Bholoo Shah
 Bi'thah
 Bible
 Bid‘ah
 Bilal ibn Ribah
 Bir Sreshtho
 Bismillah
 Bismillahir rahmanir rahim
 Black September in Jordan
 Black Stone
 Boron
 Bosniaks
 Bosnian Cyrillic
 Bosnian language
 British Mandate of Palestine
 British Raj
 Brunei
 Bukhari
 Bulugh
 Bumiputra
 Burji dynasty
 Burka
 Burqah
 Busr
 Buwayhid
 Byblos
 Báb
 Bábís

C
 Cairo
 Cairo Declaration on Human Rights in Islam
 Caliph
 Calligraphy
 Cat Stevens
 Caucasian Avars
 Cave of the Patriarchs
 Chad
 Chador
 Challenge of the Quran
 Chand Raat
 Charity
 Chechen language
 Chinese Islamic cuisine
 Chittagong
 Christian Zionism
 Christianity and Islam
 Christians
 Cologne mosque project
 Colonial Heads of Algeria
 Comoros
 Constitution of Medina
 Constitution of Pakistan
 Council on American-Islamic Relations
 Covenant
 Creation myth
 Creed
 Crescent
 Criticism of Islam
 Criticism of Muhammad
 Criticism of the Qur'an
 Crusades
 Cultural Muslim 
 Culture of Saudi Arabia
 Culture of Tajikistan

D
 Da'iy
 Da'wah
 Daf
 Dajjal
 Danishmends
 Dar al-Islam
 Darfur conflict
 Date (fruit)
 David
 Dawood
 Dawoodi Bohras
 Deen
 Deir al-Madinah
 Dervish
 Dhabihah
 Dhikr
 Dhimmi
 Dhu-n nurayn
 Dhuhr
 Dhul Hijjah
 Dhul Qidah
 Din
 Dirham
 Djibouti
 Dodecanese
 Dome of the Rock
 Donmeh
 Dost Mahommed Khan
 Druze
 Du'a
 Du'at
 Dubai
 Dunya
 Durood

E
 Early Muslim philosophy
 Ecology of Africa
 Economy of Sudan
 Edward Said
 Egypt
 Egyptian Islamic Jihad
 Egyptian language
 Ehsan Jami
 Eid al-Fitr
 Eid Mubarak
 Eid ul-Ad'haa
 Eid ul-Adha
 Eid ul-Fitr
 Eid-e Ghadeer
 Eid-e Mubahala
 Eid-ul-Adha
 Eid-ul-Fitr
 Elijah
 Elijah Muhammad
 Elohim
 Muhammad Emin Er
 Emin Pasha
 Emir
 Emirates
 Eritrea
 Ethics in religion
 Eurabia
 European influence in Afghanistan
 Ex-Muslim 
 Ex-Muslims

F
 Fahd of Saudi Arabia
 Faisal of Saudi Arabia
 Fajr
 Fakir
 Falak
 Fallujah
 Faqih
 faqir
 Faraizi movement
 Fard
 Farouk of Egypt
 Fasiq
 Fasting
 Fatah
 Fatemeh is Fatemeh
 Fatiha
 Fatimah
 Fatima Jinnah
 Fatima Mernissi
 Fatima Zahra
 Fatimid
 Fatwa
 Fazal Ilahi Chaudhry
 Fazlollah Zahedi
 Fazlur Rahman
 Female genital cutting
 Feminist tafsir
 Fidyah and Kaffara
 Fiqh
 First Anglo-Afghan War
 First cause
 Fitna
 Fitrah
 Five Pillars of Islam
 Foreign relations of Iran
 Four Rightly Guided Caliphs
 French rule in Algeria
 Friday prayers
 Fuqaha
 Fur language
 Futuwa

G
 G-breve
 Gaafar Nimeiry
 Gabriel (archangel)
 Gamal Abdel Nasser
 Genghis Khan
 Genie
 Genocide of Ottoman Turks and Muslims
 Gertrude Bell
 Ghadeer
 Ghadir Khom
 Ghayr mahram
 Ghazal
 Ghazi
 Ghaznavid Empire
 Ghazwah
 Ghulam Ishaq Khan
 Ghusl
 Glossary of Islam
 God
 Gog
 Golden Horde
 Gospel of Barnabas
 Gotthelf Bergsträsser
 Grand Mufti
 Guardian Council
 Gum arabic

H
 Ha-Mim
 Habib Bourguiba
 Hadath-Akbar
 Hadeeth
 Hadith
 Hadith qudsi
 Hafiz
 Hafsa bint Umar
 Hajarul Aswad
 Hajj
 Hakeem Noor-ud-Din
 Halaal
 Halal certification in Australia
 Hamad bin Khalifa
 Haman (Islam)
 Hamas
 Hamid Karzai
 Hamza
 Hamza Yusuf
 Hand of Fatima
 Hanif
 Haq
 Haraam
 Haram
 Harun
 Harun al-Rashid
 Hasan
 Hasan al-Askari
 Hasan bin Ali
 Hashemite
 Hashim
 Hashish
 Hashshashin
 Hassan al Turabi
 Hassaniya
 Heads of State of Rif
 Hebrew language
 Hebrew name
 Hebron
 Hejaz
 Hell
 Hermeneutics of feminism in Islam
 Hezbollah
 Hijaab
 Hijab
 Hijra (Islam)
 Hijri calendar
 Hilāl
 Hima
 Hindi
 Hindu–Muslim unity
 Hindu Kush
 Hira
 history of Bangladesh
 History of Iran
 History of Iraq
 History of Islam
 History of Kuwait
 History of Nigeria
 History of Pakistan
 History of Somalia
 History of Sudan
 History of Turkey
 History of Uzbekistan
 Holidays in Iran
 Holidays in Pakistan
 Holy Land
 Honor killing
 Hoor, Iran
 Hosni Mubarak
 Houri
 House of Saud
 Hudna
 Hudud
 Hugo Grotius
 Husain
 Husayn bin Ali
 Huseyn Shaheed Suhrawardy
 Hussein of Jordan
 Hyder Ali

I
 I am that I am
 Iajuddin Ahmed
 Ibaadah
 Ibadah
 Iblis
 Ibn Arabi
 Ibn Bajjah
 Ibn Battuta
 Ibn Hazm
 Ibn Hisham
 Ibn Ishaq
 Ibn Kathir
 Ibn Khaldun
 Ibn Khallikan
 Ibn Saud
 Ibn Taymiya
 Ibn Warraq
 Ibrahim (name)
 Ibrahim Ahmad Abd al-Sattar Muhammad
 Iddah
 Idi Amin
 Idries Shah
 Idris I of Libya
 Ifrit
 Iftaar
 Iftar
 Ignaz Goldziher
 Ihraam
 Ihram
 I'jaz
 Ijma
 Ijtihad
 Ilhaam
 Ilkhanate
 Imam
 Imam Abu Hanifa
 Imam Hanbal
 Imam Mahdi
 Imam Shafi
 Imam Shamil
 Iman (concept)
 Iman Darweesh Al Hams
 Imran Khan
 In sha' allah
 Inayat Khan
 Inclusivism
 India
 Indonesia
 Indonesian language
 Infancy Gospel of Thomas
 Injil
 Inna lillahi wa inna ilahi raji'un
 Inshallah
 Interfaith Conference of Metropolitan Washington
 International Islamic Unity Conference (Iran)
 International Islamic Unity Conference (US)
 Intifada (First)
 Intifada (Second)
 Iqamah
 Iran
 Iran hostage crisis
 Iran's nuclear program
 Iran–Iraq War
 Iranian monarchy
 Iranian Revolution
 Iraq
 Iraqi National Congress
 Iraqi Special Tribunal
 Irshad Manji
 Islamic advice literature 
 Islamic calendar (Lunar Hijri calendar)
 Islamic feminism 
 Islamic feminist views on dress codes
 Islamic literature 
 Islamic Unity week
 Isa
 Isaac
 Isha
 Ishmael
 Isidore of Seville
 Iskander Mirza
 Islam
 Islam and animals
 Islam and anti-Semitism
 Islam and clothing
 Islam and domestic violence
 Islam and flat-earth theories
 Islam and Judaism
 Islam and other religions
 Islam as a political movement
 Islam by country
 Islam in Afghanistan
 Islam in Albania
 Islam in Algeria
 Islam in Asia
 Islam in Australia
 Islam in Azerbaijan
 Islam in Bangladesh
 Islam in Bosnia and Herzegovina
 Islam in Brazil
 Islam in Bulgaria
 Islam in Cambodia
 Islam in Canada
 Islam in Chad
 Islam in China
 Islam in Comoros
 Islam in Côte d'Ivoire
 Islam in Egypt
 Islam in Ethiopia
 Islam in France
 Islam in Germany
 Islam in Ghana
 Islam in Guyana
 Islam in India
 Islam in Indonesia
 Islam in Iran
 Islam in Ireland
 Islam in Italy
 Islam in Jordan
 Islam in Kazakhstan
 Islam in Kyrgyzstan
 Islam in Libya
 Islam in Malaysia
 Islam in Maldives
 Islam in Mali
 Islam in Mauritania
 Islam in Mauritius
 Islam in Nigeria
 Islam in Oman
 Islam in Pakistan
 Islam in Philippines
 Islam in Russia
 Islam in Saudi Arabia
 Islam in Singapore
 Islam in Somalia
 Islam in South Africa
 Islam in Sri Lanka
 Islam in Sudan
 Islam in Thailand
 Islam in the Netherlands
 Islam in the United States
 Islam in Turkey
 Islam in Turkmenistan
 Islam in Uganda
 Islam in Uzbekistan
 Islam in Yemen
 Islamic architecture
 Islamic calendar
 Islamic Courts Union
 Islamic democracy
 Islamic economics
 Islamic ethics
 Islamic eschatology
 Islamic extremism
 Islamic fundamentalism
 Islamic Golden Age
 Islamic Jihad
 Islamic mythology
 Islamic organisations in Australia
 Islamic philosophy
 Islamic republic
 Islamic schools and branches
 Islamic science
 Islamic state in Palestine
 Islamic view of marriage
 Islamic view of miracles
 Islamic views of homosexuality
 Islam Yes, Islamic Party No
 Islamic world
 Islamism
 Islamist terrorism
 Islamization of knowledge
 Islamology
 Islamonline.net
 Islamophobia
 Islam Karimov
 Isma'el
 Ismaeel
 Ismah
 Ismail
 Ismail al-Faruqi
 Ismaili
 Ismail ibn Sharif
 Isnad
 Isra and Miraj
 Istanbul
 Istighfar
 Itmam al-Hujjah

J
 Ja'far
 Jaahil
 Jabalia
 Jābir ibn Hayyān
 Jacob
 Jafar Sadiq
 Jahannam
 Jahiliyyah
 Jalal al-Din Muhammad Rumi
 Jalbab
 Jama Masjid
 Jama'at al-Tawhid wal Jihad
 Jamaat-e-Islami Pakistan
 Jannah
 Javanese language
 Jazakallahu khayran
 Jean-Bédel Bokassa
 Jericho
 Jerusalem
 Jesus
 Jews
 Jews in the Middle Ages
 Jihad
 Jihad Watch
 Jinn
 Jizyah
 John Walker Lindh
 John Wansbrough
 Jon Elia
 Jonah
 Joseph (Hebrew Bible)
 Judeo-Islamic tradition
 Judæo-Arabic languages
 Jum'ah
 Juma Khan
 Jumu'ah musjid
 Juz'
 Jürgen Möllemann

K
 Ka'ba
 Ka'bah
 Kaaba
 Kaafir
 Kabul
 Kafir
 Kalaam-e-majeed
 Kalam
 Kalam cosmological argument
 Kalimah
 Kandahar
 Kanem-Bornu Empire
 Karachi
 Karbala
 Kareem Abdul-Jabbar
 Karen Armstrong
 Kashf
 Kebab
 Kedah
 Keffiyeh
 Kelantan
 Kemal Atatürk
 Kenan Evren
 Kenneth Bigley
 Khadija
 Khaleda Zia
 Khalid al-Mihdhar
 Khalid bin Walid
 Khalid of Saudi Arabia
 Khalid Shaikh Mohammed
 Khalifa
 Khan Abdul Ghaffar Khan
 Khan Yunis
 Kahndaq
 Kharaj
 Kharijites
 Khat
 Khatib
 Khilaal
 Khums
 Khutba
 Khutbah
 Khwarezmid Empire
 King of Morocco
 Kingdom of Nekor
 Kitáb-i-Aqdas
 Knidos
 Konstantinos Kanaris
 Konya
 Koran
 Kordofan
 Kufa
 Kuffar
 Kufr
 Kurdish language
 Kurta
 Kuwait

L
 La hawla wa la quwwata illa billah
 La ilaha illallah
 Laat
 Labbaik
 Labuan
 Lahore
 Lahore Ahmadiyya Movement
 Lal Bahadur Shastri
 Last Prophet
 Latakia
 Laylat al-Qadr
 Lebanon
 Leo Africanus
 Letter to Baghdadi
 Levant
 Levantine Arabic
 Leyla al-Qadr
 Liberal movements within Islam
 Libya
 List of Arabic phrases
 List of companions of the prophet Muhammad
 List of Islamophobic incidents
 List of Islamic terms in Arabic
 List of Muslims
 List of Muslim feminists
 List of Muslim Nobel Laureates
 List of Muslim scientists
 List of prime ministers of Egypt
 List of religious topics
 Lod
 Louis Farrakhan
 Lunar calendar
 Lungi

M
 Ma malakat aymanukum
 Ma'ruf
 Muadh ibn Jabal
 Madhhab
 Madina
 Member states of the Organisation of Islamic Cooperation
 Madinah
 Madinan sura
 Madrassa
 Maghazi
 Maghreb
 Maghreb Arabic
 Maghrib
 Mah
 Mahathir bin Mohamad
 Mahdi
 Maher Arar
 Mahmoud Abbas
 Mahmoud Hessaby
 Mahmud I
 Mahr
 Mahram
 Maimonides
 Makka
 Makkah
 Makkan surah
 Makruh
 Malay language
 Malcolm X
 Maldives
 Malik
 Malik Ibn Anas
 Mani
 Marja
 Marmaduke Pickthall
 Marwan al-Shehhi
 Maryam (sura)
 Masah
 Masjed
 Masjid
 Masjid-u-Shajarah
 Masjid-ul-Haram
 Maslaha
 Maulana Abul Kalam Azad
 Maulana Wahiduddin Khan
 Maumoon Abdul Gayoom
 Mawla
 Mayyit
 Mazi
 Mawla
 Mecca
 Mecca-Cola
 Medieval medicine of Western Europe
 Medina
 Meeqat
 Megawati Sukarnoputri
 Meher Baba
 Mehr
 Messiah
 Mi'raj
 Middle East
 Mihrab
 Mina
 Minaret
 Minbar
 Miracles of Muhammad
 Mir-Hossein Mousavi
 Mirza Ghulam Ahmad
 Mirza Basheer-ud-Din Mahmood Ahmad
 Mirza Nasir Ahmad
 Mirza Tahir Ahmad
 Mirza Masroor Ahmad
 Miswaak
 Mizrahi Jew
 Modern Islamic philosophy
 Mohamed al-Kahtani
 Mohammad Abaee-Khorasani
 Mohammad Ali Abtahi
 Mohammad Ali Jinnah
 Mohammad Ali Shah
 Mohammad Hatta
 Mohammad Javad Bahonar
 Mohammad Khatami
 Mohammad Najibullah
 Mohammad Rabbani
 Mohammad Reza Aref
 Mohammad Reza Khatami
 Mohammad Reza Pahlavi
 Mohammad Sadeq al-Sadr
 Mohammad Sarwar
 Mohammad Shah
 Mohammad Sharif
 Mohammad-Reza Shajarian
 Mohammed Abdullah Hassan
 Mohammed Arkoun
 Mohammed Atef
 Mohamed Atta
 Mohammed Bahr al-Uloum
 Mohammed Bouyeri
 Mohammed Jamal Khalifa
 Mohammed Mossadegh
 Mohammed Omar
 Mohammed Qalamuddin
 Mohammed VI of Morocco
 Mohammed
 Monotheism
 Moors
 Mordechai
 Morocco
 Moses
 Moslem (Muslim)
 Mosque
 Moulvi Ibrahim
 Mountain Jews
 Mozarab
 Mt. Uhud
 Mu'min
 Mu'tazili
 Muadh-dhin
 Muammar al-Gaddafi
 Muawiyah I
 Mu'awiyah ibn Hisham
 Muezzin
 Mufti
 Mughal Empire
 Muhajir
 Muhammad Ahmad
 Muhammad al-Baqir
 Muhammad al-Durrah
 Muhammad al-Idrisi
 Muhammad al-Mahdi
 Muhammad Ali
 Muhammad Ali Jinnah
 Muhammad Ali of Egypt
 Muhammad Asadullah Al-Ghalib
 Muhammad at-Taqi
 Muhammad bin Qasim
 Muhammad bin Saud
 Muhammad ibn Abd al Wahhab
 Muhammad ibn Marwan
 Muhammad ibn Zakariya al-Razi
 Muhammad in Islam
 Muhammad Iqbal
 Muhammad Naguib
 Muhammad, overview of all perspectives
 Muhammad Rafiq Tarar
 Muhammad Saeed al-Sahhaf
 Muhammad Thakurufar Al-Azam
 Muhammad V an-Nasir
 Muhammad VI al-Habib
 Muhammad Yunus
 Muhammad Zia-ul-Haq
 Muhammed Ali Jinnah
 Muharram
 Mujahid
 Mujahideen
 Mujtahid
 Mulatto
 Mullah
 Multan
 Munafiq
 Munich Massacre
 Municipalities of Libya
 Muqaddimah
 Muqtada al-Sadr
 Murabit
 Musa (prophet)
 Musa al-Kazim
 Musa bin Nusair
 Musaylimah
 Mushaf
 Mushrik
 Mushrikeen
 Music of Afghanistan
 Music of Pakistan
 Music of Saudi Arabia
 Music of Spain
 Music of Turkey
 Music of Uzbekistan
 Muslim
 Muslim American Society
 Muslim b. al-Hajjaj
 Muslim Brotherhood
 Muslim dietary laws
 Muslim League
 Muslim Student Association
 Muxlim
 Mustahab
 Muzdalafah

N
 Nabataeans
 Nabi
 Nablus
 Nabuwwat
 Nadhr
 Nadir Shah
 Nafl
 Naim Frashëri
 Naja
 Najasat
 Najis
 Nakba
 Names of God
 Names of Jerusalem
 Names of the Levant
 Naseem Hamed
 Nasir al-Din Tusi
 Nasr ibn Sayyar
 Nasreddin
 Nation of Islam
 Nation of Islam and anti-Semitism
 Negeri Sembilan
 New Delhi
 Night Journey
 Nikkah
 Niyya
 Niyyah
 Noah
 Northern Areas, Pakistan
 Nuh
 Nuh Ha Mim Keller
 Nur Muhammad Taraki
 Nusrat Fateh Ali Khan

O
 Occupations of Palestine
 Oman
 Omar Abdel-Rahman
 Omar Bongo
 Omar Hasan Ahmad al-Bashir
 Omar Khayyám
 Operation Ajax
 Operation Days of Penitence
 Operation Enduring Freedom
 Organisation of Islamic Cooperation
 Oriental
 Orientalism
 Ortoqid
 Osama bin Laden
 Osama tapes
 Osiraq
 Osiris
 Ottoman Empire
 Ottoman Turkish language
 Ottoman Turks

P
 P.B.U.H.
 Pahang
 Pahlavi
 Pahlavi dynasty
 Pak
 Pakistan
 Paktia Province
 Palestine Liberation Army
 Palestinian Arabic
 Palestinian National Covenant
 Palestinian people
 Pan Am Flight 103
 Pan-Arabism
 Panama Airline Bombing
 Partition of India
 Pashtun people
 Pattani kingdom
 Pattani separatism
 People of the Book
 PERF 558
 Persecution of Muslims
 Persia
 Persian Gulf
 Persian language
 Persian literature
 Pervez Musharraf
 Peter Arnett
 Phocas
 Pilgrimage
 Politics of Afghanistan
 Politics of Algeria
 Politics of Bahrain
 Politics of Bangladesh
 Politics of Iran
 Politics of Jordan
 Politics of Kuwait
 Politics of Morocco
 Politics of Oman
 Politics of Pakistan
 Politics of Saudi Arabia
 Politics of Syria
 Polygamy
 Prayer
 Predestination
 President of Afghanistan
 President of Iran
 President of Pakistan
 Prime Minister of Afghanistan
 Prime Minister of Bangladesh
 Prime Minister of Iran
 Prime Minister of Pakistan
 Princess Fawzia Fuad of Egypt
 Prophet
 Prophets
 Prophets of Islam
 Punjabi language
 Purdah
 Pushtu language

Q
 Qaboos of Oman
 Qada
 Qadi
 Qahtaba ibn Shabib al-Ta'i
 Qaideen
 Qajar dynasty
 Qari
 Qari Ahmadullah
 Qatar
 Qibla
 Qiblah
 Qisas
 Qiyaamah
 Qiyaamat
 Qiyaas
 Qiyam
 Qiyamah
 Qiyamat
 Qiyas
 Qudah
 Qudama ibn Ja'far
 Queen of Sheba
 Quibla
 Qunut
 Qur'an
 Quraish
 Quran
 Quran and miracles
 Quraysh (sura)
 Qurbani
 Qusay Hussein
 Qutayba ibn Muslim

R
 Ra'kat
 Rabia
 Rachel Corrie
 Rafah
 Rajab
 Rakaat
 Ramadaan
 Ramadan
 Ramadan Ali
 Ramadhan
 Ramallah
 Rashad Khalifa
 Rashid-al-Din Hamadani
 Rasool
 Rasul
 Rauf Denktaş
 Rawalpindi
 Recep Tayyip Erdoğan
 Reconquista
 Religious conversion
 Religious pluralism
 René Guénon
 Resurrection of Jesus
 Revelation
 Reza Pahlavi
 Riaz Ahmed Gohar Shahi
 Richard Francis Burton
 Richard Reid
 Richard Thompson
 Riots in Palestine of May, 1921
 Rise of the Ottoman Empire
 Riyadh
 Rohingya people
 Rohingya persecution in Myanmar
 Rubaiyat of Omar Khayyam
 Ruby Muhammad
 Ruhollah Khomeini
 Rukn
 Ruku'
 Rulers of Kel Ahaggar
 Rustamid

S
 S.A.W.
 S.W.T.
 Sa'yee
 Saadi
 Saadia Gaon
 Sabians
 Sabr
 Sacred language
 Sacred text
 Sadaqah
 Saddam Hussein
 Saeb Erekat
 Saee
 Safa
 Safavids
 Saffarid dynasty
 Safiyya bint Huyayy
 Safsaf massacre
 Sahaba
 Sahabah
 Sahabi
 Sahifa-e-Kamila
 Sahifah
 Sai Baba
 Saif ad-Din Ghazi I
 Saif al-Adel
 Saint
 Sajdah
 Salaam
 Salaat
 Saladin
 Salafi
 Salafi movement
 Salah
 Salam
 Salat ul Jum'a
 Salawat
 Sallallahu 'alaihi wa sallam
 Salman the Persian
 Salman Pak
 Salman Rushdie
 Samanid
 Samarkand
 Sanaá
 Sani Abacha
 Saniyasnain Khan
 Saqifah
 Sardar Mohammad Hashim Khan
 Sassanid dynasty
 Satan
 SATTS
 Saudi Arabia
 Saum
 Saviours' Day
 Sawm
 Sayed Qutb
 Sayyid
 Sayyid Abul Ala Maududi
 Sayyid Baraka
 Sayyid Qutb
 Sea of Galilee
 Seal of the Prophets
 Second Sudanese Civil War
 Sehri
 Selangor
 Seleucid Empire
 Seljuk Turks
 Semitic people
 Semitic languages
 Sephardi
 September 11, 2001 attacks
 Seyyed Hossein Nasr
 Sha'baan
 Shaabaan
 Shafi'i
 Shahada
 Shahadah
 Shaheed
 Shahid
 Shaikh
 Shaitan
 Shamil Basayev
 Shams
 Sharaf ad-Din Ali Yazdi
 Shargh
 Shari'ah
 Sharia
 Sharif of Mecca
 Shatt al-Arab
 Shaukat Aziz
 Shawwal
 Shayateen
 Shaytaan
 Sheba
 Sher Shah
 Shi'a
 Shi'a Islam
 Shia
 Shia Imam
 Shiite Islam
 Shirin Ebadi
 Shirk
 Shriners
 Shura
 Silsila
 Sindh
 Sira
 Sirah
 Sirwal
 Siwa Oasis
 Siwak
 Sokoto Grand Vizier
 Solomon
 Somali language
 Somalia
 Sphinx
 Star and crescent
 Sub'haanallah
 Subhanahu wa ta'ala
 Sudan
 Sufis
 Sufism
 Suhoor
 Suicide bombing
 Sujud
 Sukarno
 Sulayman ibn Hisham
 Sultan
 Sultan Ahmad Shah
 Sultanate of Rum
 Sunna
 Sunnah
 Sunnat
 Sunni Islam
 Sura
 Sura
 Surudi Milli
 Swahili language
 Syed Muhammad Naquib al-Attas
 Syedna Mohammed Burhanuddin
 Syria
 Syriac language

T
 Ta'awwuz
 Ta'zias
 Ta-Ha
 Tabari
 Tabarra
 Tabatabaei
 Tafseer
 Tafsir
 Taghut
 Tahajjud
 Taharat
 Tahir ibn Husayn
 Tahirid dynasty
 Taifa
 Taj Mahal
 Tajik language
 Tajweed
 Takbirah
 Takfir
 Talbiyah
 Taliban
 Taqdir
 Taqiyya
 Taqlid
 Taqwa
 Taraweeh
 Tarika
 Tariq ibn-Ziyad
 Tariq Ramadan
 Tarteel
 Tasbeeh
 Tatars
 Tauhid
 Tawaaf
 Tawaf
 Tawalla
 Tawbah
 Tawheed
 Tawhid
 Tayammum
 T. E. Lawrence
 Tehran
 Temple Mount
 Terengganu
 Thabit ibn Nasr
 Thabit ibn Qurra
 Terrorism
 The Satanic Verses
 The World Forum for Proximity of Islamic Schools of Thought
 Theistic evolution
 Theo van Gogh (film director)
 Throne Verse
 Timeline of Islam
 Timeline of Islamic history
 Timur
 Tipu Sultan
 Topkapı Palace
 Torah
 Transliteration
 Treaty with Tripoli (1796)
 Tulkarm
 Tunisia
 Turbah
 Turkic languages
 Turkish language
 Turkish literature
 Twelvers
 Tétouan

U
 Uday Hussein
 Ulema
 Ulugh Beg
 Umar
 Umar al-Aqta
 Umar ibn al-Khattab
 Umayyad
 Umm al-mu'mineen
 Umm Kalthoum
 Umm Kulthum
Umm walad
 Ummah
 United Arab Emirates
 United Nations Iraq-Kuwait Observation Mission
 United Republic
 United Submitters International
 Urdu language
 Urdu poetry
 Usamah ibn Munqidh
 Usman Dan Fodio
 Usule Din
 Usury
 Uthman
 Uthman ibn Affan
 Uyghur language
 Uzbek language
 Uzza

V
 Vaikom Muhammad Basheer
 Varieties of Arabic
 Violence against Muslims in India
 Vilayat-e Faqih
 Virgin Mary: Islamic view

W
 Wa 'alaikumus salam
 Wadi-us-Salaam
 wahdat al-wujud
 Wahhabism
 Wahi
 Wajib
 Wali
 Walima
 Wallace Fard Muhammad
 Waqf
 War in Afghanistan (2001–present)
 War on Terrorism
 Wasil ibn Ata
 Wasim Sajjad
 Western Sahara
 Western Wall
 Why Islam?
 William Abdullah Quilliam
 William Muir
 Witr
 Wodoo
 Women in Islam
 Women in the Qur'an
 World Trade Center bombing
 Wudhu
 Wudu
 Wuzu

X
 -

Y
 Ya Allah
 Yahya Ayyash
 Yahya Jammeh
 Yahya Khan
 Yaqub
 Yasir Qadhi
 Yasser Arafat
 Yathrib
 Yazidi
 Year of the Elephant
 Yehuda Halevi
 Yemen
 Yemeni Arabic
 Yemenite Jews
 Yiddish language
 Young Turks
 Yousuf Karsh
 Yusuf
 Yusuf al-Qaradawi
 Yusuf Estes
 Yvonne Ridley

Z
 Zacarias Moussaoui
 Zafarullah Khan Jamali
 Zahra Kazemi
 Zahiri
 Zaiddiyah
 Zakaat
 Zakah
 Zakat
 Zakir Naik
 Zalmay Khalilzad
 Zamzam Well
 Zaouia
 Zarqa
 Zayed bin Sultan Al Nahyan
 Zaynab bint Khuzayma
 Zendiq
 Zentani Muhammad az-Zentani
 Ziauddin Sardar
 Zikr
 Zikri
 Zil Hijjah
 Zil Qa'dah
 Ziyarat
 Zulfikar Ali Bhutto

See also
 List of Islamic terms in Arabic

 
Islamic and Muslim related topics